SS Edward L. Ryerson is a steel-hulled American Great Lakes freighter that entered service in 1960. Built between April 1959 and January 1960 for the Inland Steel Company, she was the third of the thirteen so-called 730-class of lake freighters, each of which shared the unofficial title of "Queen of the Lakes" because of their record-breaking length. She was not only the last steam-powered freighter built on the lakes but also the last one that was not a self-unloader. Since 2009, she has been in long-term layup in Superior, Wisconsin. She is one of only two American-owned straight deck lake freighters, the other being John Sherwin, built in 1958.

Built to transport iron ore almost exclusively, Edward L. Ryerson completed her sea trials on August 3, 1960. She then travelled to Escanaba, Michigan, where she loaded a cargo of iron ore, embarking on her maiden voyage for Indiana Harbor, Indiana, on August 4. The ship set a Great Lakes iron ore cargo haulage record that stood for three years on August 28, 1962, after loading  of iron ore in Superior, Wisconsin. Enthusiasts consider Edward L. Ryerson to be one of the most aesthetically pleasing lake freighters ever built; she quickly became one of the most popular boats on the lakes, to the point that there were rumors that at the Soo Locks, she would regularly be directed through the lock closest to the shore, the MacArthur Lock, for the benefit of boat watchers.

Because of a downturn in the steel industry, Edward L. Ryerson was laid up in Indiana Harbor for the 1986 and 1987 shipping seasons, returning to service in 1988. She was laid up for a second time in January 1994 in Sturgeon Bay, Wisconsin, where she remained inactive until April 1997. In 1998, Inland Steel was acquired by the Netherlands-based Ispat International N.V. The same year, Edward L. Ryerson was renamed Str. Edward L. Ryerson. She was sold to the Indiana Harbor Steamship Company later in 1998; she entered long-term layup at the Bay Shipbuilding Company in Sturgeon Bay in December the same year, returning to the lakes in 2006. In 2009, she entered long-term layup at the Fraser Shipyard in Superior, remaining stationary as of 2022.

History

Design and construction

In 1959, the Inland Steel Company of Chicago contracted H.C. Downer & Associates Incorporated of Cleveland to design a ship to be constructed by the Manitowoc Shipbuilding Company in Manitowoc, Wisconsin. This vessel was one of the first lakers built to the maximum length allowed for passage through the St. Lawrence Seaway, which was completed in the same year as the ship. She has a gross register tonnage of 12,170 tons and a net register tonnage of 7,637 tons.

The first keel plate was laid on April 20, 1959. Edward L. Ryerson was the third of the thirteen so-called 730-class of lake freighters built; five were American, of which she is the first. This earned her the unofficial title of Queen of the Lakes, which she shared with the other ships in her class until December 7, 1962, when the  Frankcliffe Hall was launched. Edward L. Ryersons four unique vertical-sided cargo holds were loaded through 18 watertight hatches, each . The vertical sides of the cargo holds were designed to speed up the loading and unloading process and reduce the damage caused by Hulett unloaders, and the large hatches gave the operators better visibility and access to the cargo. Each hatch admitted two chutes to ease the loading of ore. She was the first vessel on the Great Lakes to be equipped with aluminium hatch covers.

The ship is equipped with two  General Electric cross-compound steam turbines, which are powered by two 465 psi oil-burning Combustion Engineering boilers. Her boilers featured the first hydraulic combustion controls installed on an American vessel. She can carry  of fuel oil. In 1969, the installation of a diesel-powered bow thruster improved the ship's maneuverability.

Edward L. Ryersons owners intended her to be as aesthetically attractive and luxurious as possible, spending a total of $8 million (equivalent to $ in ) on her. Her accommodations, which were the first of any ship on the Great Lakes to be fully air conditioned, can accommodate up to 37 crewmen and eight guests. Boatnerd writer George Wharton described her as "the most aesthetically pleasing of all lake boats". Edward L. Ryerson was equipped with a magnetic stainless steel map of the Great Lakes for the benefit of passengers, many of whom included members of Inland Steel's management and guests from other companies. In her basic design and construction, Edward L. Ryerson was considered to be a larger version of Inland Steel's 1949 freighter Wilfred Sykes. She is the last steam-powered American freighter built on the lakes, and also the last one built without a self-unloading boom. She was the last American freighter built on the lakes until Stewart J. Cort in 1972, and the last lake freighter constructed in Manitowoc.

Name and launch
Edward L. Ryerson was named after Inland Steel's chairman of the board, Edward Larned Ryerson. He was the president of the steel service center, Joseph T. Ryerson & Son, until 1935, when the company merged with Inland Steel. From 1940 until his retirement in 1953, Ryerson remained the chairman of the board of both companies. The christening and launch ceremony of Edward L. Ryerson took place at 11:58a.m. on January 21, 1960. Sponsored by Mrs. Edward L. Ryerson, the ship was launched sideways on wooden rollers into the ice-filled Manitowoc River, in front of approximately 5000 people. The waves caused by Edward L. Ryerson sent large pieces of ice flying into the dock across the river, causing serious damage. The ship was set to leave the shipyard through the Manitowoc River on July 28, 1960, but there were several areas of the river that she could not transit because of her size. Dredging was necessary at these sections, and at one point, part of the shoreline had to be dug away. The work lasted for four hours. An article published in The Herald Times Reporter described moving Edward L. Ryerson "like building a cruiser in the basement and then engineering it through a door too small for its shortest dimension". Edward L. Ryerson completed her sea trials on August 3.

Career

Edward L. Ryerson was designed almost exclusively for the iron ore trade. After completing her sea trials, the ship departed Manitowoc in ballast shortly after midnight on August 4, for Escanaba, Michigan. Upon arriving at Escanaba, she loaded  of iron ore bound for Indiana Harbor, Indiana, where she arrived on August 6. Edward L. Ryerson set Great Lakes iron ore cargo haulage records twice during the early 1960s. Both times, she loaded iron ore in Superior, Wisconsin, and headed for Indiana Harbor, Indiana. She set the first record in 1960, when she loaded  of ore. While underway, she broke a stud of her stuffing box. She set her second record on August 28, 1962, when she loaded  of ore at the Great Northern Railway's Allouez ore docks. Her second record would be broken in 1965. Because of her top speed, she received the nickname "Fast Eddie". Edward L. Ryerson quickly became a favourite among boat watchers on the lakes and there were rumors she was regularly directed through the lock closest to the shore, the MacArthur Lock, for their benefit. On board, a stainless steel map of the Great Lakes, with a magnetic representation of Edward L. Ryerson, was installed to keep the guests informed about her location. In 1976, Joseph L. Block superseded Edward L. Ryerson as Inland Steel's largest vessel.

Because of a downturn in the steel industry, Edward L. Ryerson was laid up in Indiana Harbor from the end of 1985 to the beginning of 1988, when she returned to service. On July 18, 1992, Edward L. Ryerson loaded the first ever cargo of iron ore pellets to leave Escanaba. She once again entered layup on January 24, 1994, in Sturgeon Bay, Wisconsin, remaining inactive until 1996, returning to service on April 5, 1997. In 1998, the Netherlands-based Ispat International N.V. acquired Inland Steel, and the ship was renamed Str. Edward L. Ryerson. She was sold to the Indiana Harbor Steamship Company, which was managed by Central Marine Logistics of Griffith, Indiana, later in 1998, entering long-term layup at the Bay Shipbuilding Company in Sturgeon Bay on December 12. Throughout the 1998 shipping season, Edward L. Ryerson carried  of iron ore from Escanaba over the course of 55 visits. As part of her layup, she was moved to Sturgeon Bay's east dock on December 7, 2000, and back to Bay Shipbuilding on August 17, 2004. Edward L. Ryerson re-entered service on June 3, 2006, departing Sturgeon Bay for Escanaba on July 22, 2006, where she loaded  of iron ore bound for Indiana Harbor. She entered layup in 2009, at the Fraser Shipyard in Superior, Wisconsin. In 2013, she was moved to the Tower Slip, near Barko Hydraulics because of soil testing at the Fraser Shipyards. She was moved into the Cumming Slip in 2019 because of soil testing at the Tower Slip. Edward L. Ryerson is one of only two American-owned straight deck lake freighters, the other one being the 1958-built freighter John Sherwin.

See also
 SS Carl D. Bradley
 SS Joseph H. Thompson
 SS Edmund Fitzgerald
 MV Paul R. Tregurtha

Notes

References

Sources

 
 
 
 
 
 
 
 
 
 
 
 
 
 
 
 
 
 

Great Lakes freighters
1960 ships
Merchant ships of the United States
Queen of the Lakes
Ships built in Manitowoc, Wisconsin